Car in space may refer to:

 Lunar Roving Vehicles launched and driven on the surface of the Moon:
 Apollo 15, in July 1971
 Apollo 16, in April 1972
 Apollo 17, in December 1972
 Elon Musk's Tesla Roadster, launched into outer space in February 2018